Uyanwatta Stadium is a multi-use stadium in Matara, Sri Lanka. It is situated on the southern tip of Sri Lanka. The Uyanwatte ground is home to Matara Cricket Club. The ground, which has staged `A' internationals and U19 matches, now looks set for a major period of development.

History
The first cricket in Matara dates back to 28 December 1884 when a Combined Ceylonese Cricket Club played against Matara CC. There was no Matara Cricket Club during this period and the team was made up of a collection of cricketers who played against visiting teams from the other parts of the island.

The Matara Cricket Club was actually established in 1904, with the bulk of the side being European tea planters. In the early part of the century the ground did  not have a pavilion with the players using a shed, which had been erected for the annual Race Meet. In 1966 the then President of the Matara Sports Club, Edmund Samarasekera, who continued for 21 years in the position, played a major role in developing the venue. A new pavilion was constructed and contributions from various cricket enthusiasts assisted in completing the building.

The first international side to play in Matara was the Pakistan U23 team in 1973. Former internationals, Pramodya Wickremasinghe and Sanath Jayasuriya both come from Matara. The ground has staged `A' internationals and U19 matches.

See also

Battle of the Blues (Matara)
Battle of Golden Lions

Cricket grounds in Sri Lanka
1884 establishments in Ceylon